Verse drama is any drama written significantly in verse (that is: with line endings) to be performed by an actor before an audience.  Although verse drama does not need to be primarily in verse to be considered verse drama, significant portions of the play should be in verse to qualify.

For a very long period, verse drama was the dominant form of drama in Europe (and was also important in non-European cultures). Greek tragedy and Racine's plays are written in verse, as is almost all of William Shakespeare's, Ben Jonson's and John Fletcher's drama, and other works like Goethe's Faust and Henrik Ibsen's early plays.  In most of Europe, verse drama has remained a prominent art form, while at least popularly, it has been tied almost exclusively to Shakespeare in the English tradition.  In the English language, verse has continued.

In the new millennium, there has been a resurgence in interest in the form of verse drama. Some of them came in blank verse or iambic pentameter and endeavour to be in conversation with Shakespeare's writing styles.  King Charles III by Mike Bartlett, written in iambic pentameter, played on the West End and Broadway, as well as being filmed with the original cast for the BBC.  Likewise, La Bete by David Hirson, which endeavours to recreate Moliere's farces in rhyming couplets, enjoyed several prominent productions on both sides of the Atlantic. David Ives, known best for his short, absurdist work, has turned to "transladaptation" (his word) in his later years: translating and updating French farces, such as The School for Lies and The Metromaniacs, both of which premiered in New York City. With the renewed interest in verse drama, theatre companies are looking for "new Shakespeare" plays to produce. In 2017, the American Shakespeare Center founded Shakespeare's New Contemporaries (SNC), which solicits new plays in conversation with Shakespeare's canon.  This was partially in response to the Oregon Shakespeare Festival commissioning "modern English" versions of Shakespeare plays. SNC has been on hold since the start of the Covid-19 pandemic.

However, the twenty-first century also saw theatre practitioners using verse and hybrid forms in a much wider selection of dramatic texts and theatrical performances and forms than those inspired by Shakespeare. A transnational researcher, Kasia Lech, showed that contemporary practices reach for verse to test the boundaries of verse drama and its traditions in Western theatre, including English-language theatre but also Polish, Spanish, and Russian. Lech argues that verse is particularly relevant for contemporary theatre practice because the dialogical relationship between its rhythmic and lexical levels speaks to the globalized world’s pluralistic nature. Lech discusses how artists such as Polish Radosław Rychcik and Spanish-British Teatro Inverso use verse in multilingual contexts “as a performative tool to engage with and reflect on interlingual processes as a socio-political force and as a platform for dramaturgies of foreignness.” Nigerian Inua Ellams explores his identity that escapes geographical, national, and temporal boundaries. Russian Olga Shilyaeva in her 2018 28 дней. Трагедия менструального цикла (28 Days. The tragedy of a menstrual cycle) uses verse to talk about experience of menstruation. Irish Stefanie Preissner in her  Our Father (2011) and Solpadeine Is My Boyfriend (2012) plays with autobiography and her multiple identities “as the character she performs, as the performer, the writer, and a voice of a young generation of Ireland facing the drastic political, social, and personal changes and desperately looking for predictability.”

Dramatic verse
Dramatic verse occurs in a dramatic work, such as a play, composed in poetic form.  The tradition of dramatic verse extends at least as far back as ancient Greece.

The English Renaissance saw the height of dramatic verse in the English-speaking world, with playwrights including Ben Jonson, Christopher Marlowe and William Shakespeare developing new techniques, both for dramatic structure and poetic form.  Though a few plays, for example A Midsummer Night's Dream, feature extended passages of rhymed verse, the majority of dramatic verse is composed as blank verse; there are also passages of prose.

Dramatic verse began to decline in popularity in the nineteenth century, when the prosaic and conversational styles of playwrights such as Henrik Ibsen became more prevalent, and were adapted in English by George Bernard Shaw. Verse drama did have a role in the development of Irish theatre.

Closet drama

An important trend from around 1800 was the closet drama: a verse drama intended to be read from the page, rather than performed. Byron and Shelley, as well as a host of lesser figures, devoted much time to the closet drama, in a signal that the verse tragedy was already in a state of obsolescence. That is, while poets of the eighteenth century could write so-so poetic dramas, the public taste for new examples was already moving away by the start of the nineteenth century, and there was little commercial appeal in staging them.

Instead, opera would take up verse drama, as something to be sung: it is still the case that a verse libretto can be successful. Verse drama as such, however, in becoming closet drama, became simply a longer poetic form, without the connection to practical theatre and performance.

According to Robertson Davies in A Voice From the Attic, closet drama is "Dreariest of literature, most second hand and fusty of experience!" But indeed a great deal of it was written in Victorian times, and afterwards, to the extent that it became a more popular long form at least than the faded epic. Prolific in the form were, for example, Michael Field and Gordon Bottomley.

Dramatic poetry in general
Dramatic poetry is any poetry that uses the discourse of the characters involved to tell a story or portray a situation.

The major types of dramatic poetry are those already discussed, to be found in plays written for the theatre, and libretti. There are further dramatic verse forms: these include dramatic monologues, such as those written by Robert Browning and Alfred Tennyson and Shakespeare.

See also

 Epic poetry
 Lyric poetry
 Narrative poetry
Persona poetry

References

Further reading
Denis Donoghue (1959) The Third Voice: Modern British and American Verse Drama
Kasia Lech. (2021) Dramaturgy of Form: Performing Verse in Contemporary Theatre. Routledge. Online Link
Kasia Lech. (2021) 5 Reasons Why Verse is the Language for Theatre in 2020s. TheTheatreTimes.com Online Link
Irene Morra (2016) Verse Drama in England, 1900-2015: Art, Modernity and the National Stage. Methuen. Online Link

Genres of poetry
Drama